The 2019 NHL Entry Draft was the 57th NHL Entry Draft. The draft was held on June 21–22, 2019 at Rogers Arena in Vancouver, British Columbia.

The first three selections were Jack Hughes going to the New Jersey Devils, Kaapo Kakko being selected by the New York Rangers, and Kirby Dach being picked by the Chicago Blackhawks.

Eligibility
Ice hockey players born between January 1, 1999, and September 15, 2001, were eligible for selection in the 2019 NHL Entry Draft. Additionally, un-drafted, non-North American players born in 1998 were eligible for the draft; and those players who were drafted in the 2017 NHL Entry Draft, but not signed by an NHL team and who were born after June 30, 1999, were also eligible to re-enter the draft.

Top prospects
Source: NHL Central Scouting final (April 15, 2019) ranking.

Draft lottery

Since the 2012–13 NHL season all teams not qualifying for the Stanley Cup playoffs have a "weighted" chance at winning the first overall selection. Beginning with the 2014–15 NHL season the NHL changed the weighting system that was used in previous years. Under the new system the odds of winning the draft lottery for the four lowest finishing teams in the league decreased, while the odds for the other non-playoff teams increased. The first three picks overall in this draft were awarded by lottery on April 9, 2019. The New Jersey Devils, New York Rangers and Chicago Blackhawks won the lotteries that took place on April 9, 2019, giving them the first, second and third picks overall. The New Jersey Devils moved up two spots, while the New York Rangers moved up four spots and Chicago moved up nine spots. In the process, the Colorado Avalanche (previously acquired from Ottawa) and Los Angeles Kings moved down three spots from first and second overall, respectively, while the Detroit Red Wings and Buffalo Sabres moved down two spots, while the Edmonton Oilers, Anaheim Ducks, Vancouver Canucks, Philadelphia Flyers and Minnesota Wild each dropped one spot.

Selections by round
The order of the 2019 Entry Draft is listed below.

Round one

Notes
 The Ottawa Senators' first-round pick went to the Colorado Avalanche as the result of a trade on November 5, 2017 that sent Matt Duchene to Ottawa in exchange for Kyle Turris, Shane Bowers, Andrew Hammond, a third-round pick in 2019 and this pick (being conditional at the time of the trade). The condition – Colorado will receive a first-round pick in 2019 if the Senators' first-round pick in 2018 is inside the top ten selections and the Senators decide to defer the pick to 2019 – was converted on June 22, 2018.
 The Philadelphia Flyers' first-round pick went to the Arizona Coyotes as the result of a trade on June 21, 2019 that sent a first and second-round pick in 2019 (14th and 45th overall) to Philadelphia in exchange for this pick.
 The Arizona Coyotes' first-round pick went to the Philadelphia Flyers as the result of a trade on June 21, 2019 that sent a first-round pick in 2019 (11th overall) to Arizona in exchange for a second-round pick (45th overall) and this pick.
 The Columbus Blue Jackets' first-round pick went to the Ottawa Senators as the result of a trade on February 22, 2019 that sent Matt Duchene and Julius Bergman to Columbus in exchange for Vitalii Abramov, Jonathan Davidsson, a conditional first-round pick in 2020 and this pick (being conditional at the time of the trade). The condition – Ottawa will receive a first-round pick in 2019 if the Blue Jackets' first-round pick is outside of the top three selections in the 2019 NHL Entry Draft – was converted when the Blue Jackets clinched a spot in the 2019 Stanley Cup playoffs on April 5, 2019.
 The Winnipeg Jets' first-round pick was re-acquired as the result of a trade on June 17, 2019 that sent Jacob Trouba to New York in exchange for Neal Pionk and this pick.
The New York Rangers previously acquired this pick as the result of a trade on February 25, 2019 that sent Kevin Hayes to Winnipeg in exchange for Brendan Lemieux, a conditional fourth-round pick in 2022 and this pick (being conditional at the time of the trade). The condition – New York will receive a first-round pick in 2019 if the Jets first-round pick in 2019 is outside of the first three selections – was converted when the Jets qualified for the 2019 Stanley Cup playoffs on March 23, 2019.
 The Toronto Maple Leafs' first-round pick went to the Los Angeles Kings as the result of a trade on January 28, 2019 that sent Jake Muzzin to Toronto in exchange for Carl Grundstrom, Sean Durzi and this pick.
 The San Jose Sharks' first-round pick went to the Anaheim Ducks as the result of a trade on February 24, 2019 that sent Brandon Montour to Buffalo in exchange for Brendan Guhle and this pick (being conditional at the time of the trade). The condition – Anaheim will receive a first-round pick in 2019 if the Blues' first-round pick is between picks 20–31 then Anaheim will have the option to take either St. Louis or San Jose's first-round pick in 2019. – the exact date of conversion is unknown.
Buffalo previously acquired this pick as the result of a trade on February 26, 2018 that sent Evander Kane to San Jose in exchange for Danny O'Regan, a conditional fourth-round pick in 2019 and this pick (being conditional at the time of the trade). The condition – Buffalo will receive a first-round pick in 2019 if Kane re-signs with the Sharks for the 2018–19 NHL season and if the Sharks qualify for the 2019 Stanley Cup playoffs – was converted on May 24, 2018 and March 19, 2019, respectively.
 The St. Louis Blues' first-round pick went to the Buffalo Sabres as the result of a trade on July 1, 2018 that sent Ryan O'Reilly to St. Louis in exchange for Vladimir Sobotka, Patrik Berglund, Tage Thompson, a second-round pick in 2021 and this pick (being conditional at the time of the trade). The condition – Buffalo will receive a first-round pick in 2019 if the Blues first-round pick is outside of the top ten selections in the 2019 NHL Entry Draft – was converted when the Blues qualified for the 2019 Stanley Cup playoffs on March 29, 2019.

Round two

Notes
 The New Jersey Devils' second-round pick went to the Philadelphia Flyers as the result of a trade on June 22, 2019 that sent Arizona's second-round pick and New Jersey's third-round pick both in 2019 (45th and 65th overall) to Nashville in exchange for this pick.
Nashville previously acquired this pick as the result of a trade on June 22, 2019 that sent P. K. Subban to New Jersey in exchange for Steven Santini, Jeremy Davies, a second-round pick in 2020 and this pick.
 The Buffalo Sabres' second-round pick went to the Carolina Hurricanes as the result of a trade on August 2, 2018 that sent Jeff Skinner to Buffalo in exchange for Cliff Pu, a third and sixth-round pick in 2020 and this pick.
 The New York Rangers' second-round pick went to the Ottawa Senators as the result of a trade on June 22, 2019 that sent Florida's second-round pick and Pittsburgh's third-round pick both in 2019 (44th and 83rd overall) to Carolina in exchange for this pick.
Carolina previously acquired this pick as the result of a trade on April 30, 2019 that sent Adam Fox to New York in exchange for a conditional third-round pick in 2020 and this pick.
 The Philadelphia Flyers' second-round pick went to the Vegas Golden Knights as the result of a trade on June 22, 2019 that sent a second-round pick and Winnipeg's third-round pick both in 2019 (48th and 82nd overall) to San Jose in exchange for this pick.
San Jose previously acquired this pick as the result of a trade on June 18, 2019 that sent Justin Braun to Philadelphia in exchange for a third-round pick in 2020 and this pick.
 The Florida Panthers' second-round pick went to the Carolina Hurricanes as the result of a trade on June 22, 2019 that sent the Rangers' second-round pick (37th overall) to Ottawa in exchange for Pittsburgh's third-round (83rd overall) and this pick.
Ottawa previously acquired this pick as the result of a trade on September 13, 2018 that sent Erik Karlsson and Francis Perron to San Jose in exchange for Chris Tierney, Dylan DeMelo, Josh Norris, Rudolfs Balcers, a conditional first-round pick in 2019 or 2020, a conditional first-round pick in 2021, a conditional first-round pick no later than 2022 and this pick (being conditional at the time of the trade). The condition – Ottawa will receive the higher of Florida or San Jose's second-round pick in 2019. – was converted on March 26, 2019 when Florida was eliminated from the 2019 Stanley Cup playoffs ensuring that Florida would select higher than San Jose.
San Jose previously acquired this pick as the result of a trade on June 19, 2018 that sent Mike Hoffman and a seventh-round pick in 2018 to Florida in exchange for Vegas' fourth-round pick in 2018, a fifth-round pick in 2018 and this pick.
 The Arizona Coyotes' second-round pick went to the Nashville Predators as the result of a trade on June 22, 2019 that sent New Jersey's second-round pick in 2019 (34th overall) to Philadelphia in exchange for New Jersey's third-round pick in 2019 (65th overall) and this pick.
Philadelphia previously acquired this pick as the result of a trade on June 21, 2019 that sent a first-round pick in 2019 (11th overall) to Arizona in exchange for a first-round pick in 2019 (14th overall) and this pick.
 The Vegas Golden Knights' second-round pick went to the San Jose Sharks as the result of a trade on June 22, 2019 that sent Philadelphia's second-round pick in 2019 (41st overall) to Vegas in exchange for Winnipeg's third-round pick in 2019 (82nd overall) and this pick.
 The Dallas Stars' second-round pick went to the New York Rangers as the result of a trade on February 23, 2019 that sent Mats Zuccarello to Dallas in exchange for a conditional third-round pick in 2020 and this pick (being conditional at the time of the trade). The condition – New York will receive a second-round pick in 2019 if the Stars do not advance to the 2019 Western Conference Finals – was converted when the Stars were eliminated from the 2019 Stanley Cup playoffs on May 7, 2019.
 The Columbus Blue Jackets' second-round pick went to the Los Angeles Kings as the result of a trade on June 22, 2019 that sent a third and fifth-round pick both in 2019 (64th and 126th overall) to Montreal in exchange for this pick.
Montreal previously acquired this pick as the result of a trade on September 9, 2018 that sent Max Pacioretty to Vegas in exchange for Tomas Tatar, Nick Suzuki and this pick.
Vegas previously acquired this pick as the result of a trade on June 21, 2017 that ensured that Vegas selected William Karlsson in the 2017 NHL Expansion Draft from Columbus in exchange for David Clarkson, a first-round pick in 2017 and this pick.
 The Pittsburgh Penguins' second-round pick went to the Florida Panthers as the result of a trade on February 1, 2019 that sent Nick Bjugstad and Jared McCann to Pittsburgh in exchange for Derick Brassard, Riley Sheahan, Minnesota and Pittsburgh's fourth-round picks both in 2019 and this pick.
 The New York Islanders' second-round pick went to the Detroit Red Wings as the result of a trade on February 26, 2018 that sent Tomas Tatar to Vegas in exchange for a first-round pick in 2018, a third-round pick in 2021 and this pick.
Vegas previously acquired this pick as the result of a trade on June 21, 2017 that ensured that Vegas selected Jean-Francois Berube in the 2017 NHL Expansion Draft from the Islanders in exchange for Mikhail Grabovski, Jake Bischoff, a first-round pick in 2017 and this pick.
 The Nashville Predators' second-round pick went to the San Jose Sharks as the result of a trade on June 22, 2019 that sent Winnipeg's third-round pick in 2019 (82nd overall) and a third-round pick in 2019 (91st overall) to New Jersey in exchange for this pick.
New Jersey previously acquired this pick as the result of a trade on February 6, 2019 that sent Brian Boyle to Nashville in exchange for this pick.
 The Calgary Flames' second-round pick went to the New York Islanders as the result of a trade on June 24, 2017 that sent Travis Hamonic and a conditional fourth-round pick in 2019 to Calgary in exchange for a first and second-round pick in 2018 and this pick (being conditional at the time of the trade). The condition – New York will receive a second-round pick in 2019 if Calgary does not qualify for the 2018 Stanley Cup playoffs – was converted on March 26, 2018.
 The Tampa Bay Lightning's second-round pick went to the New York Rangers as the result of a trade on February 26, 2018 that sent Ryan McDonagh and J. T. Miller to Tampa Bay in exchange for Vladislav Namestnikov, Libor Hajek, Brett Howden, a first-round pick in 2018 and this pick (being conditional at the time of the trade). The condition – New York will receive a second-round pick in 2019 if the Lightning do not win the Stanley Cup in 2018 or 2019 – was converted on May 23, 2018 and April 16, 2019, respectively when Tampa Bay was eliminated from the playoffs.
 The Carolina Hurricanes' second-round pick went to the Minnesota Wild as the result of a trade on June 22, 2019 that sent a third-round pick and the Rangers' fourth-round pick both in 2019 (73rd and 99th overall) to Carolina in exchange for this pick.
 The San Jose Sharks' second-round pick went to the Detroit Red Wings as the result of a trade on February 24, 2019 that sent Gustav Nyquist to San Jose in exchange for a conditional third-round pick in 2020 and this pick (being conditional at the time of the trade). The condition – Detroit will receive the lower of Florida or San Jose's second-round pick in 2019. – was converted on March 26, 2019 when Florida was eliminated from the 2019 Stanley Cup playoffs ensuring that San Jose would select lower than Florida.
 The Boston Bruins' second-round pick went to the New Jersey Devils as the result of a trade on February 25, 2019 that sent Marcus Johansson to Boston in exchange for a fourth-round pick in 2020 and this pick.

Round three
 

Notes
 The Ottawa Senators' third-round pick went to the Colorado Avalanche as the result of a trade on November 5, 2017 that sent Matt Duchene to Ottawa in exchange for Kyle Turris, Shane Bowers, Andrew Hammond, a conditional first-round pick in 2018 and this pick.
 The Los Angeles Kings' third-round pick went to the Montreal Canadiens as the result of a trade on June 22, 2019 that sent Columbus' second-round pick in 2019 (50th overall) to Los Angeles in exchange for a fifth-round pick in 2019 (126th overall) and this pick.
 The New Jersey Devils' third-round pick went to the Nashville Predators as the result of a trade on June 22, 2019 that sent New Jersey's second-round pick in 2019 (34th overall) to Philadelphia in exchange for Arizona's second-round pick in 2019 (45th overall) and this pick.
Philadelphia previously acquired this pick as the result of a trade on March 21, 2018 that sent Cooper Marody to Edmonton in exchange for this pick.
Edmonton previously acquired this pick as the result of a trade February 26, 2018 that sent Patrick Maroon to New Jersey in exchange for J. D. Dudek and this pick.
 The Edmonton Oilers' third-round pick went to the Florida Panthers as the result of a trade on December 30, 2018 that sent Alex Petrovic to Edmonton in exchange for Chris Wideman and this pick (being conditional at the time of the trade). The condition – Florida will receive the higher of the Islanders or Oilers' third-round pick in 2019 – was converted on April 1, 2019 when Edmonton was eliminated from the 2019 Stanley Cup playoffs ensuring that the Oilers would select higher than the Islanders.
 The Anaheim Ducks' third-round pick went to the New Jersey Devils as the result of a trade on November 30, 2017 that sent Adam Henrique, Joseph Blandisi and a third-round pick in 2018 to Anaheim in exchange for Sami Vatanen and this pick (being conditional at the time of the trade). The condition – New Jersey will receive a third-round pick in 2019 if Henrique re-signs with the Ducks for the 2019–20 NHL season prior to Anaheim using their third-round pick in 2019 – was converted on July 16, 2018.
 The Vancouver Canucks' third-round pick went to the Tampa Bay Lightning as the result of a trade on June 22, 2019 that sent J. T. Miller to Vancouver in exchange for Marek Mazanec, a conditional first-round pick 2020 and this pick.
 The Minnesota Wild's third-round pick went to the Carolina Hurricanes as the result of a trade on June 22, 2019 that sent a second-round pick in 2019 (59th overall) to Minnesota in exchange for the Rangers' fourth-round pick in 2019 (99th overall) and this pick.
 The Chicago Blackhawks' third-round pick went to the Pittsburgh Penguins as the result of a trade on June 22, 2019 that sent Buffalo's fourth-round pick, Tampa Bay's fifth-round pick and a seventh-round pick all in 2019 (98th, 151st and 207th overall) to Arizona in exchange for this pick.
Arizona previously acquired this pick as the result of a trade on July 12, 2018 that sent Marcus Kruger, MacKenzie Entwistle, Jordan Maletta, Andrew Campbell and a fifth-round pick in 2019 to Chicago in exchange for Marian Hossa, Vinnie Hinostroza, Jordan Oesterle and this pick.
 The Florida Panthers' third-round pick went to the Minnesota Wild as the result of a trade on June 22, 2019 that sent a third-round pick in 2020 to Nashville in exchange for this pick.
Nashville previously acquired this pick as the result of a trade on June 23, 2018 that sent a third-round pick in 2018 to Florida in exchange for this pick.
 The Dallas Stars' third-round pick went to the New Jersey Devils as the result of a trade on February 23, 2019 that sent Ben Lovejoy to Dallas in exchange for Connor Carrick and this pick.
 The Columbus Blue Jackets' third-round pick went to the Florida Panthers as the result of a trade on June 22, 2019 that sent Minnesota and Pittsburgh's fourth-round picks both in 2019 (104th and 114th overall) to Columbus in exchange for this pick.
 The Winnipeg Jets' third-round pick went to the New Jersey Devils as the result of a trade on June 22, 2019 that sent Nashville's second-round pick in 2019 (55th overall) to San Jose in exchange for a third-round pick in 2019 (91st overall) and this pick.
San Jose previously acquired this pick as the result of a trade on June 22, 2019 that sent Philadelphia's second-round pick in 2019 (41st overall) to Vegas in exchange for a second-round pick in 2019 (48th overall) and this pick.
Vegas previously acquired this pick as the result of a trade on June 21, 2017 that sent Columbus' first-round pick in 2017 to Winnipeg and ensured that Vegas selected Chris Thorburn in the 2017 NHL Expansion Draft from Winnipeg in exchange for a first-round pick in 2017 and this pick.
 The Pittsburgh Penguins' third-round pick went to the Carolina Hurricanes as the result of a trade on June 22, 2019 that sent the Rangers' second-round pick in 2019 (37th overall) to Ottawa in exchange for Florida's second-round pick in 2019 (44th overall) and this pick.
Ottawa previously acquired this pick as the result of a trade on February 23, 2018 that sent Derick Brassard to Vegas in exchange for this pick.
Vegas previously acquired this pick as the result of a trade February 23, 2018 that sent Tobias Lindberg to Pittsburgh in exchange for this pick.
 The New York Islanders' third-round pick went to the Edmonton Oilers as the result of a trade on February 24, 2018 that sent Brandon Davidson to New York in exchange for this pick.
 The Nashville Predators' third-round pick went to the Vegas Golden Knights as the result of a trade on July 1, 2017 that sent Alexei Emelin to Nashville in exchange for this pick.
 The Washington Capitals' third-round pick went to the Los Angeles Kings as the result of a trade on February 21, 2019 that sent Carl Hagelin to Washington in exchange for a conditional sixth-round pick in 2020 and this pick.
 The San Jose Sharks' third-round pick went to the Washington Capitals as the result of a trade on June 22, 2019 that sent a fourth-round pick and Buffalo's fifth-round pick both in 2019 (118th and 129th overall) to New Jersey in exchange for this pick.
New Jersey previously acquired this pick as the result of a trade on June 22, 2019 that sent Nashville's second-round pick in 2019 (55th overall) to San Jose in exchange for Winnipeg's third-round pick in 2019 (82nd overall) and this pick.

Round four

Notes
 The Buffalo Sabres' fourth-round pick went to the Arizona Coyotes as the result of a trade on June 22, 2019 that sent Chicago's third-round pick in 2019 (74th overall) to Pittsburgh in exchange for Tampa Bay's fifth-round pick and a seventh-round pick both in 2019 (151st and 207th overall) and this pick.
Pittsburgh previously acquired this pick as the result of a trade on June 27, 2018 that sent Conor Sheary and Matt Hunwick to Buffalo in exchange for this pick (being conditional at the time of the trade). The condition – Pittsburgh will receive a fourth-round pick in 2019 if Buffalo does not trade away Hunwick before the 2019 NHL draft or if Sheary does not get 20 goals or 40 points during the 2018–19 NHL season – was converted on June 22, 2019.
 The New York Rangers' fourth-round pick went to the Carolina Hurricanes as the result of a trade on June 22, 2019 that sent a second-round pick in 2019 (59th overall) to Minnesota in exchange for a third-round pick in 2019 (73rd overall) and this pick.
Minnesota previously acquired this pick as the result of a trade on February 20, 2019 that sent Charlie Coyle to Boston in exchange for Ryan Donato and this pick (being conditional at the time of the trade). The condition – Minnesota will receive the Rangers' fourth-round pick in 2019 if Boston advances to the 2019 Eastern Conference Second Round – was converted on April 23, 2019.
Boston previously acquired this pick as the result of a trade on September 11, 2018 that sent Adam McQuaid to New York in exchange for Steven Kampfer, a conditional seventh-round pick in 2019 and this pick.
 The Vancouver Canucks' fourth-round pick went to the Buffalo Sabres as the result of a trade on June 22, 2019 that sent San Jose's fourth-round pick and Winnipeg's sixth-round pick both in 2019 (122nd and 175th overall) to Vancouver in exchange for this pick.
 The Minnesota Wild's fourth-round pick went to the Columbus Blue Jackets as the result of a trade on June 22, 2019 that sent a third-round pick in 2019 (81st overall) to Florida in exchange for Pittsburgh's fourth-round pick in 2019 (114th overall) and this pick.
Florida previously acquired this pick as the result of a trade on February 1, 2019 that sent Nick Bjugstad and Jared McCann to Pittsburgh in exchange for Derick Brassard, Riley Sheahan, a second and fourth-round pick both in 2019 and this pick (being conditional at the time of the trade). The condition – Dallas will receive the higher of Minnesota or Pittsburgh's fourth-round picks in 2019 – was converted on April 2, 2019 when Minnesota was eliminated from the 2019 Stanley Cup playoffs.
Pittsburgh previously acquired this pick as the result of a trade on January 28, 2019 that sent Jamie Oleksiak to Dallas in exchange for this pick.
Dallas previously acquired this pick as the result of a trade on December 19, 2017 that sent Jamie Oleksiak to Pittsburgh in exchange for this pick.
Pittsburgh previously acquired this pick as the result of a trade on December 19, 2017 that sent Josh Archibald, Sean Maguire and a sixth-round pick in 2019 to Arizona in exchange for Michael Leighton and this pick.
Arizona previously acquired this pick as the result of a trade on February 26, 2017 that sent Martin Hanzal, Ryan White and a fourth-round pick in 2017 to Minnesota in exchange for Grayson Downing, a first-round pick in 2017, a second-round pick in 2018 and this pick (being conditional at the time of the trade). The condition – Arizona will receive a fourth-round pick in 2019 if Minnesota does not advance past the First Round of the 2017 Stanley Cup playoffs – was converted on April 22, 2017.
 The Montreal Canadiens' fourth-round pick went to the San Jose Sharks as the result of a trade on June 22, 2019 that sent a fourth-round pick in 2020 to Montreal in exchange for this pick.
 The Colorado Avalanche's fourth-round pick went to the Nashville Predators as the result of a trade on July 1, 2017 that sent Colin Wilson to Colorado in exchange for this pick.
 The Columbus Blue Jackets' fourth-round pick went to the New York Rangers as the result of a trade on February 25, 2019 that sent Adam McQuaid to Columbus in exchange for Julius Bergman, a seventh-round pick in 2019 and this pick.
 The Pittsburgh Penguins' fourth-round pick went to the Columbus Blue Jackets as the result of a trade on June 22, 2019 that sent a third-round pick in 2019 (81st overall) to Florida in exchange for Minnesota's fourth-round pick in 2019 (104th overall) and this pick.
Florida previously acquired this pick as the result of a trade on February 1, 2019 that sent Nick Bjugstad and Jared McCann to Pittsburgh in exchange for Derick Brassard, Riley Sheahan, a second-round pick in 2019, Minnesota's fourth-round pick in 2019 and this pick.
 The New York Islanders' fourth-round pick went to the Calgary Flames as the result of a trade on June 24, 2017 that sent a first and second-round pick in 2018 and a conditional second-round pick in 2019 to New York in exchange for Travis Hamonic and this pick. The condition – Calgary will receive a fourth-round pick in 2019 if their second-round pick in 2019 transfers to the New York Islanders – was converted on March 26, 2018.
 The Washington Capitals' fourth-round pick went to the New Jersey Devils as the result of a trade on June 22, 2019 that sent San Jose's third-round pick in 2019 (91st overall) to Washington in exchange for Buffalo's fifth-round pick in 2019 (129th overall) and this pick.
 The Calgary Flames' fourth-round pick went to the Los Angeles Kings as the result of a trade on February 11, 2019 that sent Nate Thompson and Arizona's fifth-round pick in 2019 to Montreal in exchange for this pick.
Montreal previously acquired this pick as the result of a trade on June 23, 2018 that sent Winnipeg's fourth-round pick in 2018 to Calgary in exchange for this pick.
 The San Jose Sharks' fourth-round pick went to the Vancouver Canucks as the result of a trade on June 22, 2019 that sent a fourth-round pick in 2019 (102nd overall) to Buffalo in exchange for Winnipeg's sixth-round pick in 2019 (175th overall) and this pick.
Buffalo previously acquired this pick as the result of a trade on February 26, 2018 that sent Evander Kane to San Jose in exchange for Danny O'Regan, a conditional first-round pick in 2019 and this pick (being conditional at the time of the trade). The condition – Buffalo will receive a fourth-round pick in 2019, at San Jose's choice – was converted on June 22, 2019.
 The Boston Bruins' fourth-round pick went to the Chicago Blackhawks as the result of a trade on February 26, 2018 that sent Tommy Wingels to Boston in exchange for this pick (being conditional at the time of the trade). The condition – Chicago will receive a fourth-round pick in 2019 if Boston advances to the 2018 Second Round – was converted on April 25, 2018.
 The St. Louis Blues' fourth-round pick went to the Toronto Maple Leafs as the result of a trade on February 15, 2018 that sent Nikita Soshnikov to St. Louis in exchange for this pick.

Round five

Notes
 The Los Angeles Kings' fifth-round pick went to the Montreal Canadiens as the result of a trade on June 22, 2019 that sent Columbus' second-round pick in 2019 (50th overall) to Los Angeles in exchange for a third-round pick in 2019 (64th overall) and this pick.
 The Buffalo Sabres' fifth-round pick went to the New Jersey Devils as the result of a trade on June 22, 2019 that sent San Jose's third-round pick in 2019 (91st overall) to Washington in exchange for a fourth-round pick in 2019 (118th overall) and this pick.
Washington previously acquired this pick as the result of a trade on February 22, 2019 that sent Madison Bowey and a second-round pick in 2020 to Detroit in exchange for Nick Jensen and this pick.
Detroit previously acquired this pick as the result of a trade on December 4, 2017 that sent Scott Wilson to Buffalo in exchange for this pick.
 The Edmonton Oilers' fifth-round pick went to the Montreal Canadiens as the result of a trade on June 23, 2018 that sent Hayden Hawkey to Edmonton in exchange for this pick.
 The Philadelphia Flyers' fifth-round pick went to the Winnipeg Jets as a result of a trade on June 3, 2019 that sent Kevin Hayes to Philadelphia in exchange for this pick.
 The Minnesota Wild's fifth-round pick went to the Vegas Golden Knights as the result of a trade on January 21, 2019 that sent Brad Hunt and a sixth-round pick in 2019 to Minnesota in exchange for this pick (being conditional at the time of the trade). The condition – Vegas will receive the higher of Minnesota or Washington's fifth-round picks in 2019. – was converted on April 2, 2019 when Minnesota was eliminated from the 2019 Stanley Cup playoffs ensuring that Minnesota would select higher than Washington.
 The Chicago Blackhawks' fifth-round pick went to the Florida Panthers as the result of a trade on June 22, 2019 that sent a fifth-round pick in 2020 to Montreal in exchange for this pick.
Montreal previously acquired this pick as the result of a trade on June 23, 2018 that sent Florida's fifth-round pick in 2018 to Chicago in exchange for this pick.
 The Arizona Coyotes' fifth-round pick went to the Montreal Canadiens as the result of a trade on February 11, 2019 that sent Calgary's fourth-round pick in 2019 to Los Angeles in exchange for Nate Thompson and this pick.
Los Angeles previously acquired this pick as the result of a trade on January 24, 2019 that sent Dominik Kubalik to Chicago in exchange for this pick.
Chicago previously acquired this pick as the result of a trade on July 12, 2018 that sent Marian Hossa, Vinnie Hinostroza, Jordan Oesterle and a third-round pick in 2019 to Arizona in exchange for Marcus Kruger, MacKenzie Entwistle, Jordan Maletta, Andrew Campbell and this pick.
 The Montreal Canadiens' fifth-round pick went to the Vegas Golden Knights as the result of a trade on June 22, 2017 that sent David Schlemko to Montreal in exchange for this pick.
 The Columbus Blue Jackets' fifth-round pick went to the Buffalo Sabres as the result of a trade on June 22, 2019 that sent Toronto's sixth-round pick and a seventh-round both in 2019 (177th and 191st overall) to Detroit in exchange for this pick.
Detroit previously acquired this pick as the result of a trade on June 23, 2018 that sent Montreal's sixth-round pick in 2018 to Columbus in exchange for this pick.
 The Washington Capitals' fifth-round pick went to the Minnesota Wild as the result of a trade on February 26, 2018 that sent Mike Reilly to Montreal in exchange for this pick.
Montreal previously acquired this pick as the result of a trade on February 21, 2018 that sent Jakub Jerabek to Washington in exchange for this pick.
 The Tampa Bay Lightning's fifth-round pick went to the Arizona Coyotes as the result of a trade on June 22, 2019 that sent Chicago's third-round pick in 2019 (74th overall) to Pittsburgh in exchange for Buffalo's fourth-round pick and a seventh-round pick both in 2019 (98th and 207th overall) and this pick.
Pittsburgh previously acquired this pick as the result of a trade on June 15, 2019 that sent Olli Maatta to Chicago in exchange for Dominik Kahun and this pick.
Chicago previously acquired this pick as the result of a trade on January 11, 2019 that sent Jan Rutta and a seventh-round pick in 2019 to Tampa Bay in exchange for Slater Koekkoek and this pick.
 The San Jose Sharks' fifth-round pick went to the Washington Capitals as the result of a trade on June 22, 2019 that sent a seventh-round pick in 2019 (211th overall) and 2020 to San Jose in exchange for this pick.

Round six

Notes
 The Ottawa Senators' sixth-round pick went to the Vancouver Canucks as the result of a trade on January 2, 2019 that sent Anders Nilsson and Darren Archibald to Ottawa in exchange for Mike McKenna, Tom Pyatt and this pick.
 The Vancouver Canucks' sixth-round pick went to the San Jose Sharks as the result of a trade on June 22, 2019 that sent Francis Perron and a seventh-round pick in 2019 (215th overall) to Vancouver in exchange for Tom Pyatt and this pick.
 The Arizona Coyotes' sixth-round pick went to the Philadelphia Flyers as the result of a trade on January 11, 2019 that sent Jordan Weal to Arizona in exchange for Jacob Graves and this pick.
 The Vegas Golden Knights' sixth-round pick went to the Minnesota Wild as the result of a trade on January 21, 2019 that sent a conditional fifth-round pick in 2019 to Vegas in exchange for Brad Hunt and this pick.
 The Columbus Blue Jackets' sixth-round pick went to the Arizona Coyotes as the result of a trade on July 18, 2018 that sent Ryan MacInnis to Columbus in exchange for Jacob Graves and this pick (being conditional at the time of the trade). The condition – Arizona will receive a sixth-round pick in 2019 if MacInnis plays in less than 20 games during the 2018–19 NHL season – was converted on February 28, 2019.
 The Winnipeg Jets' sixth-round pick went to the Vancouver Canucks as the result of a trade on June 22, 2019 that sent a fourth-round pick in 2019 (102nd overall) to Buffalo in exchange for San Jose's fourth-round pick in 2019 (122nd overall) and this pick.
Buffalo previously acquired this pick as the result of a trade on February 25, 2019 that sent Nathan Beaulieu to Winnipeg in exchange for this pick.
 The Pittsburgh Penguins' sixth-round pick went to the Arizona Coyotes as the result of a trade on December 19, 2017 that sent Michael Leighton and a fourth-round pick in 2019 to Pittsburgh in exchange for Josh Archibald, Sean Maguire and this pick.
 The Toronto Maple Leafs' sixth-round pick went to the Detroit Red Wings as the result of a trade on June 22, 2019 that sent Columbus' fifth-round pick in 2019 (143rd overall) to Buffalo in exchange for a seventh-round pick in 2019 (191st overall) and this pick.
Buffalo previously acquired this pick as the result of a trade on June 23, 2018 that sent a sixth-round pick in 2018 to Toronto in exchange for this pick.
 The Washington Capitals' sixth-round pick went to the Vancouver Canucks as the result of a trade on June 23, 2018 that sent a sixth-round pick in 2018 to Washington in exchange for a sixth-round pick in 2018 and this pick.
 The Calgary Flames' sixth-round pick went to the Carolina Hurricanes as the result of a trade on June 29, 2017 that sent Eddie Lack, Ryan Murphy and a seventh-round pick in 2019 to Calgary in exchange for Keegan Kanzig and this pick.
 The St. Louis Blues' sixth-round pick went to the Anaheim Ducks as the result of a trade on February 25, 2019 that sent Michael Del Zotto to St. Louis in exchange for this pick.

Round seven

Notes
 The Buffalo Sabres' seventh-round pick went to the Detroit Red Wings as the result of a trade on June 22, 2019 that sent Columbus' fifth-round pick in 2019 (143rd overall) to Buffalo in exchange for Toronto's sixth-round pick in 2019 (177th overall) and this pick.
 The New York Rangers' seventh-round pick went to the Boston Bruins as the result of a trade on September 11, 2018 that sent Adam McQuaid to New York in exchange for Steven Kampfer, a fourth-round pick in 2019, and this pick (being conditional at the time of the trade). The condition – Boston will receive a seventh-round pick in 2019 if McQuaid plays in at least 25 regular season games during the 2018–19 NHL season – was converted on January 29, 2019.
 The Anaheim Ducks' seventh-round pick went to the Chicago Blackhawks as the result of a trade on March 1, 2017 that sent Spencer Abbott and Sam Carrick to Anaheim in exchange for Kenton Helgesen and this pick.
 The Chicago Blackhawks' seventh-round pick went to the Tampa Bay Lightning as the result of a trade on January 11, 2019 that sent Slater Koekkoek and a fifth-round pick in 2019 to Chicago in exchange for Jan Rutta and this pick.
 The Montreal Canadiens' seventh-round pick was re-acquired as the result of a trade on June 22, 2019 that sent a seventh-round pick in 2020 to Philadelphia in exchange for this pick.
Philadelphia previously acquired this pick as the result of a trade on June 23, 2018 that sent Montreal's seventh-round pick in 2018 to Montreal in exchange for this pick.
 The Vegas Golden Knights' seventh-round pick went to the Pittsburgh Penguins as the result of a trade on June 23, 2018 that sent a seventh-round pick in 2018 to Vegas in exchange for this pick.
 The Dallas Stars' seventh-round pick went to the Toronto Maple Leafs as the result of a trade on October 1, 2018 that sent Connor Carrick to Dallas in exchange for this pick (being conditional at the time of the trade). The condition – Toronto will receive a seventh-round pick in 2019 if Carrick plays in less than 50 games during the 2018–19 NHL season – was converted on January 6, 2019.
 The Columbus Blue Jackets' seventh-round pick went to the New York Rangers as the result of a trade on February 25, 2019 that sent Adam McQuaid to Columbus in exchange for Julius Bergman, a fourth-round pick in 2019 and this pick.
 The Winnipeg Jets' seventh-round pick went to the Montreal Canadiens as the result of a trade on June 30, 2018 that sent Simon Bourque to Winnipeg in exchange for Steve Mason, Joel Armia, a fourth-round pick in 2020 and this pick.
 The Pittsburgh Penguins' seventh-round pick went to the Arizona Coyotes as the result of a trade on June 22, 2019 that sent Chicago's third-round pick in 2019 (74th overall) to Pittsburgh in exchange for Buffalo's fourth-round pick and Tampa Bay's fifth-round pick both in 2019 (98th and 151st overall) and this pick.
 The Toronto Maple Leafs' seventh-round pick went to the St. Louis Blues as the result of a trade on June 22, 2019 that sent a seventh-round pick in 2020 to Toronto in exchange for this pick.
 The Washington Capitals' seventh-round pick went to the Pittsburgh Penguins as the result of a trade on June 22, 2019 that sent a seventh-round pick in 2020 to San Jose in exchange for this pick.
San Jose previously acquired this pick as the result of a trade on June 22, 2019 that sent a fifth-round pick in 2019 (153rd overall) to Washington in exchange for a seventh-round pick in 2020 and this pick.
 The Calgary Flames' seventh-round pick went to the Columbus Blue Jackets as the result of a trade on February 23, 2019 that sent Anthony Duclair and a second-round pick in 2020 and 2021 to Ottawa in exchange for Ryan Dzingel and this pick. 
Ottawa previously acquired this pick as the result of a trade on February 26, 2018 that sent Nick Shore to Calgary in exchange for this pick.
 The Carolina Hurricanes' seventh-round pick went to the Calgary Flames as the result of a trade on June 29, 2017 that sent Keegan Kanzig and a sixth-round pick in 2019 to Carolina in exchange for Eddie Lack, Ryan Murphy and this pick.
 The San Jose Sharks' seventh-round pick went to the Vancouver Canucks as the result of a trade on June 22, 2019 that sent Tom Pyatt and a sixth-round pick in 2019 (164th overall) to San Jose in exchange for Francis Perron and this pick.
 The Boston Bruins' seventh-round pick went to the Carolina Hurricanes as the result of a trade on June 23, 2018 that sent Vegas' seventh-round pick in 2018 to the New York Rangers in exchange for this pick.
The Rangers previously acquired this pick as the result of a trade on February 25, 2018 that sent Rick Nash to Boston in exchange for Ryan Spooner, Matt Beleskey, Ryan Lindgren, a first-round pick in 2018 and this pick.

Draftees based on nationality

North American draftees by state/province

See also
 2016–17 NHL transactions
 2017–18 NHL transactions
 2018–19 NHL transactions
 2019–20 NHL transactions
 2019–20 NHL season
 List of first overall NHL draft picks
 List of NHL players

References

External links

2019 NHL Entry Draft player stats at The Internet Hockey Database

NHL Entry Draft
National Hockey League Entry Draft
Entry Draft
2010s in Vancouver
NHL Entry Draft
NHL Entry Draft
NHL Entry Draft